Endothelin B receptor-like protein 2 is a protein that in humans is encoded by the GPR37L1 gene.

References

Further reading

G protein-coupled receptors